George Lill Swain was Dean of Limerick from  1929 to 1953.

He was born in 1870 and educated at Trinity College, Dublin. He was ordained in 1894 and after curacies  at Drummaul and Limerick worked overseas in Valencia before incumbencies at Kilkeedy, Dysert and St Michael, Limerick.

He died on 26 April 1955.

Notes

1870 births
Alumni of Trinity College Dublin
Deans of Limerick
1955 deaths